The Hershey Open was a golf tournament in Pennsylvania on the PGA Tour from 1933 to 1941. It was played at the Hershey Country Club in Hershey on what is now called the West Course. It was played as a 72-hole stroke play event every year except 1938. That year, it was played as a 126-hole round-robin match play tournament with eight two-man teams and called the Hershey Four-Ball; its format was identical to the one used by the Inverness Invitational Four-Ball. The event was not held in 1940, when the club hosted the PGA Championship.

Three times it was won by the resident golf pro—Henry Picard in 1936 and 1937 and Ben Hogan in his first year at Hershey in 1941. His win in 1938 in the team event with Vic Ghezzi was Hogan's first as a professional; his first win as an individual came in March 1940 in North Carolina.

Winners

References

Former PGA Tour events
Golf in Pennsylvania